Grandes Chilenos de Nuestra Historia (sometimes simply called Grandes Chilenos) was a Chilean TV program produced and broadcast by state channel Televisión Nacional de Chile during 2008. It was based on the style of BBC's 100 Greatest Britons. Former President Salvador Allende was elected the "Greatest Chilean", however, some controversial personalities such as Augusto Pinochet or Bernardo O'Higgins were preemptively excluded from the poll.

Top 10
Salvador Allende (1908–1973), 38.80 percent of the votes, physician and politician, 28th President.
Arturo Prat (1848–1879), war hero, 38.44 percent.
Saint Alberto Hurtado (1901–1952), 7.97 percent, a Jesuit priest canonised by Pope Benedict XVI in 2005.
Víctor Jara (1932–1973), folk singer and songwriter.
Manuel Rodríguez (1785–1818), General.
José Miguel Carrera (1785–1821), General.
Lautaro (1535–1557), Mapuche warrior.
Gabriela Mistral (1889–1957) Nobel Prize for Literature.
Pablo Neruda (1904–1973), Nobel Prize for Literature.
Violeta Parra (1917–1967), singer and songwriter.

See also

 Greatest Britons spin-offs

References

Estrada, Daniela (19 September 2008). "Salvador Allende – Greatest Chilean, by Popular Acclaim." IPS News. Retrieved November 2011.

2008 Chilean television series debuts
Chile
Lists of Chilean people